Albanotrechus beroni is a species of beetle in the family Carabidae, the only species in the genus Albanotrechus.

References

Trechinae